The list of current and past Rajya Sabha members from the Jammu and Kashmir Union territory. The UT elects 4 member for a term of 6 years and are indirectly elected by the members of the Jammu and Kashmir legislative assembly

Current members (Feb 2021)

As of Feb 2021 elections to the 4 vacant seats from Jammu and Kashmir were not held in February as the union territory was under President's rule and the assembly had been dissolved. The union territory will get its representation as soon as the Jammu and Kashmir Legislative Assembly is elected.

Keys:

Alphabetical list of all Rajya Sabha members from Jammu and Kashmir state 
Alphabetical list by last name

The list is incomplete.
 Star (*) represents current Rajya Sabha members from JK State.

References

External links
Rajya Sabha homepage hosted by the Indian government
List of Sitting Members of Rajya Sabha (Term Wise) 
MEMBERS OF RAJYA SABHA (STATE WISE RETIREMENT LIST) 

Jammu and Kashmir
 
Rajya Sabha